"Strangers When We Meet" is a song by David Bowie, originally recorded for his 1993 album The Buddha of Suburbia. In 1995, Bowie re-recorded the song for his Outside album, and this version was edited and released as the second single from the album, paired with a reworked version of Bowie's 1970 song "The Man Who Sold the World".

Development 
"Strangers When We Meet" is a song that Bowie recorded 3 times: once in 1993 with Reeves Gabrels and his band Modern Farmer (unreleased), once in 1993 with Bowie's band for release on the album The Buddha of Suburbia, and then again in 1994–95 for inclusion on Outside. Both biographers Nicholas Pegg and Chris O'Leary agree that the song seemed out-of-place on Outside: Pegg says that song, "at the end of 1. Outsides art-rock insanity, 'Strangers When We Meet' seems even more incongruous, resolving all the album's angst and black comedy in a soothing slice of conventional pop", and O'Leary calls the song "transient" and not suited on either of the albums on which it appeared, with the song almost seeming like a bonus track appended at the end of Outside. The Buddha version is called "tense, more compact, nervier" compared to the "lush" version on Outside.

B-sides 
While the version of "The Man Who Sold the World" was labeled a "live version", it was actually a studio-recorded track based on a reworked version of the song recorded in late October 1995 and performed on the Outside Tour, and mixed by Brian Eno. This version was re-released in 2020 on the EP Is It Any Wonder?

"Get Real" was released as a bonus track to the Japanese release of Outside in 1995, as a b-side to this single, and again on the 2004 re-release of Outside and in the 2007 David Bowie (box set). The song, a leftover from the Outside sessions, was described as a "far more conventional pop-rock composition than anything on the album" with a reference to some of Bowie's own "unlamented" mid-Eighties work. A sheet of paper dated 6 March 1994, on display at the David Bowie Is exhibit, showed that this song's lyrics were at least partly run through the Verbasizer program, which Bowie liked to use like scissors and paper to cut up and re-arrange his lyrics. Pegg called the song "an appealing glimpse into the wealth of extra material recorded during the [Outside] sessions, and another example of Bowie's ongoing preoccupation with the nature of reality."

Release and promotion 
The single was released in November 1995. While most versions were of the newer Outside version of the song, an American promo CD included a rare single edit of the Buddha of Suburbia version, and a rare 1993 promo cassette contained a different version still of the Buddha recording, and featured different percussion and mixing.

Samuel Bayer’s video for the song shared some visual similarities with that for "The Hearts Filthy Lesson", but was a more simple and placid affair set in a decaying artist's studio.

Live performances 
In promotion of the album and single, Bowie performed "Strangers When We Meet" four times on various shows in the US and UK. First, on 27 October 1995, it was performed on The Tonight Show with Jay Leno. On 10 November 1995, Bowie performed an unfortunately "lacklustre" version of the song on Top of the Pops while in the middle of rehearsals for the Outside Tour, and then played it again on 2 December 1995 on Later... with Jools Holland. It was performed one more time live on TV on 26 January 1996 on French TV's Taratata. Subsequently, the song was performed occasionally during Bowie's 1995–1996 Outside Tour and 1997's Earthling Tour. One recording of the song, recorded during the Outside Tour, was released on No Trendy Réchauffé (Live Birmingham 95) (2020), which takes its name from a lyric fragment from the song.

Chart performance 
The double A-side reached number 39 on the UK charts. In Sweden, "Strangers When We Meet" peaked at number 56 in 1996.

Other releases 
The 1995 rerecording of the song appeared on the Best of Bowie DVD (2002) and the 3-CD version of Nothing Has Changed (2014).

Track listing

7" version 
 "Strangers When We Meet" (Edit) (Bowie)  – 4:19
 "The Man Who Sold the World" (Live) (Bowie)  – 3:35

UK CD version 
 "Strangers When We Meet" (Edit) (Bowie)  – 4:19
 "The Man Who Sold the World" (Live) (Bowie)  – 3:35
 "Strangers When We Meet" (Album version) (Bowie)  – 5:06
 "Get Real" (Bowie, Eno)

US CD version 
 "Strangers When We Meet" (Album version) (Bowie)  – 5:06
 "Strangers When We Meet" (Buddha of Suburbia album version) (Bowie)  – 5:06
 "The Man Who Sold the World" (Live) (Bowie)  – 3:35

Australian CD version 
 "Strangers When We Meet" (Edit) (Bowie)  – 4:19
 "The Man Who Sold the World" (Live) (Bowie)  – 3:35
 "Strangers When We Meet" (Album version) (Bowie)  – 5:06
 "Strangers When We Meet" (Buddha of Suburbia album version) (Bowie)  – 5:06

UK promo version 
 "Strangers When We Meet" (Edit) (Bowie)  – 4:19

US promo version 
 "Strangers When We Meet" (Edit) (Bowie)  – 4:19
 "Strangers When We Meet" (Buddha of Suburbia Edit) (Bowie)  – 4:10
 "Strangers When We Meet" (Album version) (Bowie)  – 5:06

Personnel 
David Bowie – vocals, production
Brian Eno – synthesizers on "Strangers When We Meet" and "Get Real", production
Reeves Gabrels – lead guitar
Carlos Alomar – rhythm guitar
Erdal Kızılçay – bass, keyboards on "Strangers When We Meet" and "Get Real"
Mike Garson – piano, keyboards on "The Man Who Sold The World"
Sterling Campbell – drums on "Strangers When We Meet" and "Get Real"
Gail Ann Dorsey – bass guitar on "The Man Who Sold the World"
Peter Schwartz – keyboards on "The Man Who Sold the World"
George Simms – keyboards on "The Man Who Sold the World"
Zachary Alford – drums on "The Man Who Sold the World"
David Richards – production

Charts

References 

1993 songs
1995 singles
David Bowie songs
Song recordings produced by Brian Eno
Songs written by David Bowie
Music videos directed by Samuel Bayer
Song recordings produced by David Bowie
RCA Records singles
1995 songs